Gwynn, Gwynne, Guinn or Gwyn, are given names meaning "white" or/and "blessed" in Welsh and Cornish.

Gwyn and its variants are male given names, indicated by the spelling using 'y' rather than 'e'. 'Gwen' or 'Gwendolen' are female equivalents. 'Gwyneth' can cause confusion, as this is a female name with apparently male spelling, however, this name has a different etymological origin [ibid].

Notable people with the name include:

Given name
Gwyn Ashton (born 1961), Welsh musician
Gwyn Cready (born 1962), American author
Gwyn Davies (rugby) (1908–1992), Welsh rugby player
Gwyn Davies (1919–1995), Welsh cricketer
Gwynne Dyer (born 1943), Canadian journalist
Gwyn Evans (footballer) (1935–2000), Welsh footballer
Gwyn Evans (rugby union) (born 1957), Welsh rugby player
Gwynn Evans (1915–2001), Welsh cricketer
Gwynne Evans (1880–1965), American swimmer
Gwynne Owen Evans (1940–1964), English murderer (real name: John Robson Walby), one of the last two men to be executed in the United Kingdom.
Gwyn Francis (1896–1987), Welsh rugby player
Gwynne Geyer, American opera singer
Gwynne Gilford (born 1946), American actress
Gwyn Griffin (1922–1967), English novelist
J. Gwyn Griffiths (1911–2004), Welsh poet
Gwynn ap Gwilym (born 1955), Welsh poet
Gwyn Headley (born 1946), British businessman
Gwynne Herbert, British actress
Gwynne Howell (born 1938), Welsh opera singer
Gwyn Hughes (disambiguation)
Gwyn Jones (disambiguation)
Gwynne Jones (born 1945), Zimbabwe-born English cricketer
Gwynn Parry Jones (1891–1963), Welsh opera singer
T. Gwynn Jones (1871–1949), Welsh poet
Gwyn Martin (1921–2001), Welsh photographer and pharmacist
Gwyn Manning (1915–2003), Welsh footballer
Gwyn Morgan, Canadian businessman
Gwyn Morgan (civil servant) (1934–2010) British Labour Party official and EU civil servant
Gwyn Morgan (writer) (born 1954), Welsh author
Gwyn Morgans (born 1932), Welsh former professional footballer,
Gwyn Nicholls (1874–1939), Welsh rugby union player
Gwyn Hanssen Pigott (1935–2013), Australian ceramic artist
Gwyn R Price, Welsh politician
Gwyn Prosser (born 1943), British politician
Gwynne Pugh, Welsh-born American architect
Gwyn Richards (1905–1985), Welsh rugby player
Gwyn Richards (cricketer) (born 1951), Welsh cricketer
Gwyn Roberts, American musician
Gwyn Rowlands (1928–2010), English rugby player
Gwyn Hyman Rubio (born 1949), American author
Gwyn Shea (born 1937), American politician
Gwynne Shipman (1909–2005), American actress
Gwynne Shotwell (born 1963), American businesswoman
Gwyn Staley (1927–1958), American race car driver
Gwyn Thomas (disambiguation)
Gwyn R. Tompkins (1861–1938), American horse trainer
Gwyn Williams (disambiguation)
Gwyn A. Williams (1925–1995), Welsh historian
Gwynn Williams (disambiguation)
W. S. Gwynn Williams (1896–1978), British musician

Surname
Aaron Gwyn (born 1972), American novelist
Alice Claypoole Gwynne (1845–1934), American philanthropist and socialite
 Alice Gwynne, birth name of Kiki Preston (1898–1946), American socialite
Andrew Gwynne (born 1974), British politician
Anisha Nicole Gwynn (born 1985), American singer better known as Anisha Nicole or Nee-Nee Gwynn (daughter of Tony Sr.)
Anne Gwynne (1918–2003), American actress
Arlissa Guinn, birth name of Arlissa Veliz (born 1983), mother of King Scott I of Lavari
Arthur Gwynn (1874–1898), Irish cricketer and rugby player
Aubrey Gwynn (1892–1983), Irish historian
Bill Gwynne (1913–1991), New Zealand cricket umpire
Charles Gwynn (1870–1962), Irish-born British Army officer
Chris Gwynn (born 1964), American baseball player
Darbi Gwynn, American actress
David Gwynn (1861–1910), Welsh rugby player
David Gwynne (1904–1934), Welsh cricketer
Denis Rolleston Gwynn (1893–1973), Irish journalist
Edward Gwynn (1868–1941), Irish literary scholar
Edward Castres Gwynne (1811–1888), Australian lawyer
Eirwen Gwynn (1916–2007), Welsh nationalist, teacher, scientist, writer
Emlyn Gwynne (1898–1962), Welsh rugby player
Francis Gwyn (1648–1734), Welsh politician
Fred Gwynne (1926–1993), American actor
Gareth Gwynn, Welsh entertainer
George Gwynne (c. 1623–1673), Welsh politician
Glen Gwynne (born 1972), Australian soccer player
Haydn Gwynne (born 1957), English actress
Herbert Britton Gwyn (1873–1934), American newspaper editor
Horace Gwynne (1912–2001), Canadian boxer
Howel Gwyn (1806–1888), British politician
Howell Gwynne (disambiguation)
Howell Arthur Gwynne (1865–1950), British author and newspaper editor
Jack Gwynne (1895–1969), American illusionist
James Gwyn (1828–1906), American Civil War soldier
Jason Gwynne, British journalist
John Gwynne (disambiguation)
John David Gwynn (1907–1998), Irish cricketer
John Tudor Gwynn (1881–1956), Irish cricketer
John Wellington Gwynne (1814–1902), puisne justice of the Supreme Court of Canada
John W. Gwynne (1889–1972), seven-term Republican U.S. Representative
Julia Gwynne (1856–1954), English opera singer
Letitia Gwynne (born 1962), Northern Irish journalist
Llewellyn Gwynne (1863–1957), the first Anglican Bishop of Egypt and Sudan
Lucius Gwynn (1873–1902), Irish rugby player
Lucy Gwynn (1866-1947), first Lady Registrar in Dublin
Marcus Gwyn (born 1977), American baseball player
Mark Gwyn, American law enforcement officer
Marmaduke Gwynne (1691–1769), influential Welsh Methodist
Michael Gwynn (1916–1976), British actor
Michael C. Gwynne (born 1942), American actor
Nathaniel Gwynne (1849–1883), American Civil War soldier
Nell Gwynne (1650–1687), long-time mistress of King Charles II
Nevile Gwynne, British grammarian
Owen Gwyn (died 1633), Welsh priest
Patrick Gwynne (1913–2003), British architect
Peter Gwynne (1929–2011), New Zealand-born Australian actor
Phillip Gwynne (born 1958), Australian author
R. S. Gwynn (born 1948), American poet
Richard Gwyn (disambiguation)
Robert Gwynn (1877–1962), Irish cricketer
Roland Gwynne (1882–1971), mayor of Eastbourne and lover of suspected serial killer John Bodkin Adams
Rowland Gwynne (c. 1658–1726), Welsh politician
Rupert Gwynne (1873–1924), British politician
S. C. Gwynne, American writer
Sam Gwynne (born 1987), English footballer
Sandra Gwyn (1935–2000), Canadian journalist
Sarah Gwynne, birth name of Sarah Wesley (1726–1822), influential Welsh Methodist
Stephen Gwynn (1864–1950), Irish journalist
Tony Gwynn (1960–2014), American baseball player and Hall of Fame member
Tony Gwynn Jr. (born 1982), American baseball player and son of Tony (Sr.)
Walter Gwynn (1802–1882), American engineer
William Gwynn (1856–1897), Welsh rugby player
Woody Gwyn (born 1944), American artist

See also
James O'Gwynn (1928–2011), American musician
Peter Gwynn-Jones (1940–2010), English officer of arms
Allan Gwynne-Jones (1892–1982), English painter
Helen Gwynne-Vaughan (1879–1967), English botanist
Carol Bishop-Gwyn, Canadian writer

References

English unisex given names